Thought and Change is a 1964 book by the philosopher Ernest Gellner, in which the author outlines his views on "modernity" and looks at the processes of social change and historical transformation and, perhaps most forcefully, the power of nationalism. Maleŝević and Haugaard argue that the method is the socio-historical method, and Gellner sets out a powerful sociology of specific philosophical doctrines and ideologies, from utilitarianism and Kantianism to nationalism. The chapter specifically dealing with nationalism was later expanded to form the basis of Gellner's most famous book, Nations and Nationalism (1983).

They also note that rather than looking at the internal coherence of philosophies, Gellner places them in their historical context. He thus explains their origins and their likely influence. Modernity is considered to be "unique, unprecedented and exceptional", with characteristics sustained by growth of economies and increases in cultural uniformity.

See also
Gellner's theory of nationalism

Editions
(1965) Thought and Change, London: Weidenfeld and Nicolson; Chicago: University of Chicago Press (with the imprint 1964). pp. viii + 224.

References

1964 non-fiction books
Thought and Change
Books about nationalism
Books by Ernest Gellner
English-language books
Modernity
Thought and Change